Norte Vista High School is a high school in Riverside, California, part of the Alvord Unified School District, and the home of the Norte Vista Braves.

History
Norte Vista started as a junior high school, named Arlington Junior High, from 1958 to 1961. The first graduating class was in 1964.

Notable alumni 

 Frank Corral, former NFL placekicker

References

Educational institutions established in 1961
High schools in Riverside, California
International Baccalaureate schools in California
Public high schools in California
1961 establishments in California